The International Snow and Ice Sculpture Festival "Ice, Snow, and Fire" (sometimes translated as "Ice, Snow and Flame") has been held annually in Perm, Russia, in Gorky Amusement Park since 1995.

The festivals holds two competitions: in ice sculpture and snow sculpture.

See also
 Winter festival

References

External links
2000: 
1999: 
1998: 
1997: 3rd Festival

Winter festivals
Festivals in Russia
Perm, Russia
Festivals established in 1995
1995 establishments in Russia
Snow sculpture